Glasgow Bridge may refer to:

Glasgow Bridge, Glasgow over the Clyde sometimes known as Jamaica Bridge.
Glasgow Bridge, Kirkintilloch, the site of the Roman Fortlet and bridge over the Forth and Clyde Canal.
Glasgow Bridge, Missouri over the Missouri River adjacent to a rail bridge.